This page list the published work of Harry Collingwood, the pseudonym for William Joseph Cosens Lancaster. The 44 novels and the stories are organised by year of first publication, but the tables can be sorted interactively.

Novels

Sources

This list of novels above is based on a range of sources including the British Library Catalogue for the author, the Wikisource page for the author, Project Gutenberg, the Internet Archive, WorldCat, HathiTrust, Collingwood books available from the used books trade, and publishers catalogues and advertisements for the period. This list agrees with the list provided by Dizer, although he includes an omnibus edition as a separate work. Years of first publication were taken from the British Library, but not all the novels were catalogued at the British Library and even when they were, there were gaps in the information as they did not always indicate:
The actual year of publication rather than the nominal one.
The number of pages in the book
Whether the book was illustrated or not
The name of the illustrator, if any
The number of illustrations, if any

As noted in G. A. Henty, it was common for some publishers, especially Blackie, to print not the year of publication, but the following one, so that they might look fresh for two Christmas buying seasons. This sometimes led to American editions having an earlier date than the UK edition as was the case for The Log of a Privateersman which has a date of 1896 for the Scribner edition in the US and 1897 for the Blackie edition in the UK. However, this book was published in 1896 in the UK also and was reviewed in The Scotsman  (A tale palpitating with perilous adventure, fighting at sea, storms, wrecks, and multitudinous hazards.. . . ) in October and in St James Gazette (This is just the book to put into the hands of lads with a love for things nautical. .  .) in November of that year. Except where noted in the list above, the actual year of publication has been confirmed by contemporary reviews in the year of publication.

Some of the information from sources such as WorldCat has been verified by examining scans of books and:
Verifying the page count
Verifying the number of illustrations (if not stated on the title page) . Note that the number of illustrations can vary by edition. In that case, two or more numbers may be given for the number of illustrations.
Verifying the name of the illustrator from the illustrations is not printed on the title page

American Publishers

E. P. Dutton acted for Griffith & Farran. SPCK worked through E. and J. B. Young initially, and later through E.S. Gorham. The books published by Blackie in the UK were often published by Scribner and Welford in the US. This firm was set up by Charles Scribner and Charles Welford specifically to import or reprint foreign books (almost entirely from England), and were the largest such firm in the US. In January 1891, Scribner & Welford was subsumed under Charles Scribner's Sons which then took over publishing the Collingwood Blackie novels in the US. Other publishers were also involved in publishing Collingwood's work in the US, particularly A. L. Burt who produced cheap editions sometimes with fewer illustrations. Piracy was also a problem in the US market. Dizer states that of the five copies of The Congo Rovers he holds, three are pirate editions. Given the mix of importation, local publishing, and piracy, it is difficult to build a definitive list of us editions.

Piracy in the UK
The following apology appeared in September 1910 in book trade publications: Messrs. James Henderson and Sons, Ltd., of Red Lion House, Red Lion Court, Fleet Street, London, E.C., beg to apologise to Messrs. Blackie & Son, Ltd., Publishers, of London and Glasgow, for having unwittingly published a story named "The Cruise of the Flying-Fish," by "Colin Dawson," the same having been copied by its ostensible author from the "Log of the Flying-Fish," written by Harry Collingwood, and being a grave infringement of Messrs. Blackie & Son, Ltd., copyright in that work. Messrs. James Henderson & Sons, Ltd., deeply regret the circumstances and have caused the infringing work to be withdrawn from circulation.

Potential additional works
The Oxford Dictionary of National Biography states that Lancaster wrote more than fifty books for boys, Current listings of Titles by Harry Collingwood on the British Library, Project Gutenberg, the Internet Archive, Abe Books (a rare books retailing service), the list provided by Dizer, and Wikisource list only 44 in total, and two of these are nearly identical, with To Treasure Bound being an slightly edited reissue of The Secret of the Sands. Additional potential titles are:
In the Grip of Anarchists listed as one of Collingwood's books in the entry for him in Who's Who in Children's Literature. An advertisement for Chums in May 1896 states that the new issue begins a serial story by Harry Collingwood with this name. No record of a book with such a title was found. However, the title would be an accurate description of the plot of "Overdue" (1910).
The Adventures of Lieut Courtenay R.N is advertised as being by Harry Collingwood in a 1898 catalogue from Griffiths Farran, Browne & Co Ltd. However, Lieut Courtenay was the hero of A Pirate of the Caribbees (1898) published by Griffith Farran, Browne.
Missing: A Tale of the Merchant Marine by Harry Collingwood, is listed in a notice from Blackie & Son in the Academy in September 1888. The same title was announced in The Publishers Weekly by Scribner & Welford in the same month. However the description of this title from a catalogue attached to one of their books  is exactly the same as for The Missing Merchant Man in a catalogue in the following year. Newbolt explains that Missing: A Tale of the Merchant Service seems to have been a provisional title used before publication.

Some titles are known by more than one name. For example, In Search of El Dorado (1915) is sometimes knows as A pair of Adventurers in Search of El Dorado. Under the Ensign of the Rising Sun (1916) is also known as Under a Foreign Flag. There is also room for confusion among the titles. The First Mate (1914) is subtitled The Story of A Strange Cruise but this should not be confused with A Strange Cruise (1912). There is also at least one omnibus volume containing With Airship and Submarine (1908), Two Gallant Sons of Devon (1913), and A Chinese Command (1915).

Misattributed work
Leisure Lyrics by a busy man by William John Lancaster is frequently misattributed to WJC Lancaster. However, a quick perusal of the text shows that the author of Leisure Lyrics used the initials WJL, was a long-time employee of the Prudential Assurance Company, had several children, and lived in Putney. These facts fit William John Lancaster rather than WJC Lancaster.

Re-issued work
Many of Lancaster's novels were reprinted multiple times. The WorldCat page for The Pirate Island lists 26 different print editions for that title held by libraries, one of the most popular of his novels. This does not mean that there are 26 different print editions held by libraries as data entry errors can read to duplicated entries for the same text. However, there are at least 16 distinct editions listed. WorldCat libraries hold editions issued by Blackie of London in 1885, 1893, 1902, 1905, 1923, and 1934 (in which year there were two editions with different illustrators, presumably a cheaper black and white edition and a more expensive colour one). The British Library holds three of these Blackie editions. WorldCat aggregates the holdings of libraries, so it is perfectly possible that there were other editions that are not currently held in libraries, either not having been purchased by them, or having been lost or disposed of in the last hundred and thirty years. The WorldCat page for The Rover's Secret shows 20 print editions for that title.

Normally the reprinted books bore the same title as the original and had a completely identical text. For Treasure Bound (1897) is an exception to this rule. It is a single volume re-issue of “The Secret of the Sands or the ‘Water Lily’ and her crew” (1879), the first book by Lancaster. The 1879 edition, published by Griffith and Farran, was in two volumes. Most of the chapters in For Treasure Bound are the same as in The Secret of the Sands, word for word. Most of the changes are in the restructuring and tightening of Chapter Three. One change throughout the book is the replacement of "etc." with "etcetera". The subtitle for Chapter 12 (Chapter 2 of Volume 2 in the original) was changed from A Miracle to A Mirage. Other than this, the two books have the same plot, characters, dialogue, incidents etc. 

Demonstrating the complexity of the multiple editions, The Secret of the Sands was also issued as a New Edition in a single volume by Griffith, Farran, Okeden, & Welsh in 1888, but seems to have exactly the same text as the 1879 edition. For Treasure Bound was reissued in 1910 as a New Edition with illustrations in colour by no less an artist than Walter Ernest Webster. Neither the 1879 nor the 1888 editions of The Secret of the Sands had any illustrations. The 1888 edition of For Treasure Bound had a frontispiece, and the 1910 edition had four colour plates and a full colour inset in the front cover.

Themes in the novels
The Robinsonade, the castaway or desert island genre of fiction influence by Robinson Crusoe, developed rapidly as  part of the mid-Victorian writing boom.  Boehmer states that Motifs of shipwreck, resourceful settlement and cultivation, treasure, slaves and the fear of cannibalism resurfaced time and again in boy's stories. Baker and Womak note that other Victorian writers such as Marryat, Ballantyne, and W. G. Kingston also presented the protagonists of their novels with challenges such as surviving shipwreck, fighting with savages or pirates.  Collingwood's plots include not only these elements of the Robinsonade, but also his own hobbies, such as sailing and yacht-design, in the novels. Note that grey cells in the following table mean that no copy of the book is to hand to check the plot, and the plot items listed are related in reviews of the book in question.

Short Works

Sources
The list of short works by Harry Collingwood is largely based on the British Juvenile Story Papers and Pocket Libraries Index run by Steve Holland. Indexing of British boys' magazines and story papers is ongoing. As Collingwood contributed to both The Union Jack and to Chums he may have written for other such outlets. It is possible that there may be many more short works by Harry Collingwood than those given in the table above.

Notes

References

External links
 
  
 British Juvenile Story Papers and Pocket Libraries Index
 Historic Naval Fiction page for Harry Collingwood
 Works by Harry Collingwood at the Hathi Trust.

Lists of books